The 1956–57 NBA season was the 11th season of the National Basketball Association.  The season ended with the Boston Celtics winning the NBA Championship (which would be the first of their 17 NBA titles), beating the St. Louis Hawks 4 games to 3 in the NBA Finals.

Notable occurrences 
 The 1957 NBA All-Star Game was played in Boston, Massachusetts, with the East beating the West 109–97.  Local hero Bob Cousy of the Boston Celtics wins the game's MVP award.

Final standings

Eastern Division

Western Division

x – clinched playoff spot

Playoffs

Statistics leaders

Note: Prior to the 1969–70 season, league leaders in points, rebounds, and assists were determined by totals rather than averages.

NBA awards
Most Valuable Player: Bob Cousy, Boston Celtics
Rookie of the Year: Tom Heinsohn, Boston Celtics

All-NBA First Team:
F – Paul Arizin, Philadelphia Warriors
F – Dolph Schayes, Syracuse Nationals
C – Bob Pettit, St. Louis Hawks
G – Bob Cousy, Boston Celtics
G – Bill Sharman, Boston Celtics

 All-NBA Second Team:
F – Maurice Stokes, Rochester Royals
F – George Yardley, Fort Wayne Pistons
C – Neil Johnston, Philadelphia Warriors
G – Dick Garmaker, Minneapolis Lakers
G – Slater Martin, St. Louis Hawks

References
1956–57 NBA Season Summary basketball-reference.com. Retrieved December 10, 2010